Poe Elementary School may refer to:
 Poe Elementary School (Houston), Texas, U.S.
 Poe Elementary School, Wheeling Community Consolidated School District 21, Illinois, U.S.
 Edgar Allan Poe Classical School, a Chicago public school, Illinois, U.S.
 Poe Elementary School, a school in Wake County, North Carolina, U.S.
 Edgar Allan Poe School, a public elementary school in New York City, U.S.

See also
Edgar Allan Poe School (disambiguation)
Edgar Allan Poe